This is a list of the International Financial Reporting Standards (IFRSs) and official interpretations, as set out by the IFRS Foundation. It includes accounting standards either developed or adopted by the International Accounting Standards Board (IASB), the standard-setting body of the IFRS Foundation.

The IFRS include
 International Financial Reporting standards (IFRSs)—developed by the IASB;
 International Accounting Standards (IASs)—developed by the International Accounting Standards Committee (IASC) and adopted by the IASB;
 Interpretations originated from the International Financial Reporting Interpretations Committee (IFRICs); and
 Standing Interpretations Committee (SICs).

The list contains all standards and interpretations regardless whether they have been suspended.

List of  Reporting Standards and International Accounting Standards

List of Interpretations

References

External links
 International Accounting Standards Board website

International Financial Reporting Standards